The Preston Mountaineering Club is one of the older mountaineering clubs in the United Kingdom.  Members from the Preston and Blackburn area founded the club in 1933. In the early days of the club, regular visitors were from Lake District given its proximity to the area.  The PMC is affiliated to the British Mountaineering Council.

External links
Preston Mountaineering Club

Sport in Preston
Climbing clubs in the United Kingdom
Sports organizations established in 1933